Red Canyon is a canyon in the Caballo Mountains in Sierra County, New Mexico.

References

Red Canyon (Caballo Mountains)
Red Canyon (Caballo Mountains)